KWXD is an active rock formatted broadcast radio station licensed to Asbury, Missouri, serving Pittsburg in Kansas and Joplin and Carthage in Missouri.  KWXD is owned and operated by MyTown Media, Inc.

References

External links
RadioX 103-5 Online

1993 establishments in Missouri
Active rock radio stations in the United States
Radio stations established in 1993
WXD